On to Better Things (stylized in lowercase) is the second studio album by Puerto Rican recording artist Iann Dior. It was released on January 21, 2022, through 10K Projects. Production was handled by several record producers, including Brian Lee, Cashmere Cat, Cirkut, KBeaZy, Nick Mira, Omer Fedi, Taz Taylor and Travis Barker among others. It features guest appearances from Lil Uzi Vert and Machine Gun Kelly. The album peaked at number 28 on the US Billboard 200, selling 17,000 album-equivalent units in its first week.

Critical reception

On to Better Things was met with generally favorable reviews from critics. At Metacritic, which assigns a normalized rating out of 100 to reviews from mainstream publications, the album received an average score of 68, based on five reviews.

Kyann-Sian Williams of NME rated the album 4 out of 5 stars, saying that it "bottles up that teenage angst as perfectly as the golden age of pop-punk music". AllMusic's Fred Thomas found "several tracks ("Heavy", "Heartbreak3r", "Regret") follow a similar emo-rap style, but On to Better Things gets more interesting when Dior commits fully to exploring different approaches". Ims Taylor of The Line of Best Fit wrote: "Complicate It", "Heavy", "Heartbreak3r", all standalone fine, but ultimately all bring the same contribution to the shape of on to better things without providing much else. Where he digresses though, he does so excellently, promising that maybe with the challenge of a feature or with the fire to push his sound a bit more, he could be great». Chris Saunders of Clash wrote: "there are moments where Dior shows his undoubted potential and those moments save this album from being completely mediocre, unfortunately, those moments don't come anywhere near often enough". Dani Blum of Pitchfork stated that the artist "stays vague and vacant throughout the album, invested in his feelings but short on interesting ideas".

Track listing

Notes
 Track titles are stylized in all lowercase
 "Heartbreaker" is stylized "heartbreak3r"

Personnel
 Dale Becker – mastering (1, 2, 4–15)
 Mike Tucci – mastering (3)
 Hector Vega – mastering (6, 12)
 Serban Ghenea – mixing (1, 6, 10, 12, 13)
 Edgard Herrera – mixing (2, 3, 8), engineering (9)
 Teezio – mixing (4, 9, 14)
 Adam Hawkins – mixing (7, 11, 15)
 Benjamin Thomas – engineering (3)
 Young Era – engineering (3, 10)
 Ojivolta – engineering (4)
 Mark Schick – engineering (13)
 Ryan Cantu – engineering (14)

Charts

References

2022 albums
Albums produced by Cirkut
Albums produced by KBeaZy
Albums produced by Nick Mira
Albums produced by Omer Fedi
Albums produced by Cashmere Cat
Albums produced by Travis Barker
Albums produced by Taz Taylor (record producer)